Robert Edward Lane (born ) was a Canadian insurance executive and politician from. Lane served as a Progressive Conservative member of the House of Commons of Canada.

He represented the Winnipeg—St. James electoral district in Manitoba, which he won in the 1979 federal election. He did not serve in the cabinet led by Prime Minister Joe Clark. After serving his only term, the 31st Canadian Parliament, he was defeated in the 1980 federal election by Cyril Keeper of the New Democratic Party.  He married Violet Cabel in November 1950, during which time he resided in Medicine Hat, Alberta. She died in 2021.

References

External links
 

Living people
Members of the House of Commons of Canada from Manitoba
Progressive Conservative Party of Canada MPs
Year of birth uncertain
Year of birth missing (living people)